Derek Turnbull (born 2 October 1961) is a former Scotland international rugby union player.

Rugby Union career

Amateur career

Turnbull was born in Hawick. He started playing rugby union with Hawick Trades before being picked up by Hawick.

Provincial career

He played for South of Scotland.

He played for the Reds Trial side in their match against Blues Trial on 3 January 1987.

International career

He made 15 appearances for the Scotland national rugby union team.

He made his international rugby debut on 6 June 1987 in the quarter-finals of the 1987 Rugby World Cup against New Zealand at Christchurch. He went on the 1988 tour of Zimbabwe, although full caps were not awarded. He was also on the 1990 tour of New Zealand. His last appearance was against Wales in Cardiff 1994.

Policing career

Turnbull became a police officer. He was honoured with a chief constable's commendation for his bravery after saving a pensioner from an escaped bull in Galashiels in November 2006.

References

1961 births
Living people
Hawick RFC players
Hawick Trades players
Male rugby sevens players
Reds Trial players
Rugby union flankers
Rugby union players from Hawick
Scotland international rugby sevens players
Scotland international rugby union players
Scottish rugby union players
South of Scotland District (rugby union) players